Sizophila Solontsi (born 9 March 1992) is a South African rugby sevens player. She represented South Africa at the 2022 Rugby World Cup Sevens in Cape Town. She was also named in South Africa's women's fifteens team for the Rugby World Cup in New Zealand.

References 

Living people
1992 births
Female rugby sevens players
South African female rugby union players
South Africa international women's rugby sevens players